Lead magnesium niobate is a relaxor ferroelectric. It has been used to make piezoelectric microcantilever sensors.

References

Niobates
Magnesium compounds
Lead compounds
Piezoelectric materials